Prince Mohammad Hassan Mirza II Qajar (born 18 July 1949) is the son of Hamid Mirza and a grandson of Mohammad Hassan Mirza, the last Crown Prince of Iran from the rule of the Qajar dynasty. As heir apparent, he is considered the Qajar pretender to the Sun Throne. He currently lives in Dallas, Texas, in the United States. He is known as Mickey Qajar among his close family members and friends.

He married Shahnaz Khanum (née Sokhansanj; born in 1954).

They have two daughters:
Princess Laleh Qajar (born in 1988 in Kerman).
Princess Negar "Nina" Qajar (born in 1989 in Kerman).

Ancestry

See also
Ahmad Shah Qajar
Reza Shah Pahlavi – Pahlavi

References

External links
Qajar pages

Qajar princes
1949 births
Living people
Iranian royalty
Iranian emigrants to the United States
Qajar pretenders to the Iranian throne
American Muslims
People from Dallas